Walters may refer to:

Places
United States
 Walters, Minnesota, a city
 Walters, Oklahoma, a city
 Walters, Virginia, an unincorporated community

Other uses
 Walters (surname)
 Walters (character), a character on Tale Spin
The Walters, an alternative rock band from Chicago, Illinois
 Walters Art Museum, often referred to as, "The Walters;" a major art museum in Baltimore

See also
 Walter (disambiguation)
 Justice Walters (disambiguation)
 Walter's Hot Dog Stand